Böhme (transliterated Boehme) may refer to:

 Böhme (surname), a surname (including a list of people with that name)
 Böhme (river), in Lower Saxony, Germany
 Böhme, Lower Saxony, a municipality in Lower Saxony, Germany
 Boehme's giant day gecko (Phelsuma madagascariensis boehmei)
 Böhme's gecko (Tarentola boehmei)

See also 
 Bohm (disambiguation)
 Böhm (disambiguation)
 Boehm, a surname (including a list of people with that name)
 Böhmer, a surname (including a list of people with that name)